

Notes and references

surnames H to K